The Latvian Paralympic Committee (LPC) is responsible for Latvia's participation in the Paralympic Games.

Structure
 President: Ms. Daiga Dadzīte

See also
Latvia at the Paralympics
Latvian Olympic Committee

References

External links
Official Site

National Paralympic Committees
Paralympic
 
Disability organisations based in Latvia